The Thompson Light Rifle was an attempt by the Auto-Ordnance Company to manufacture a light rifle for the United States Armed Forces. The overall weapon was based on their well proven .45 ACP submachine gun, although the original .30 Carbine caliber rifle was based on the M1921/27 variants. It worked well but due to the war effort was found expensive for mass production and its weight defied the concept of a light rifle.

The only major differences from the Light Rifle and SMG was the barrel shroud which housed a quick barrel change device similar to the MG42 and pressed steel components to ease production and reduce weight. The in-line stock reduced barrel climb improving accuracy. The Thompson Light Rifle was more reliable and accurate than the M1 carbine that was adopted and also came with the capability of select fire, which made it close to the likes of the StG-44.

Auto-Ordnance also submitted two other models not based on the Thompson SMG for tests in the .30 Carbine competitions in May and June, 1941. Their first light rifle was a more conventional rifle with recoil-operated locked-breech action and weighed about 5.5 pounds. The modified version tested September, 1941 was semi-auto only, had 80 parts, and was found difficult to disassemble and reassemble.

See also 
 Carbine, Cal .30, M1A1 (based on Winchester M1 carbine)

References

External links 
Thompson "Light Rifle" (M1 Carbine) Prototype

.30 Carbine firearms
Assault rifles of the United States
Trial and research firearms of the United States